The 1979–80 season was the 65th season in Hajduk Split's history and their 34th season in the Yugoslav First League. Their 1st-place finish in the 1978–79 season meant it was their 34th successive season playing in the Yugoslav First League.

Competitions

Overall

Yugoslav First League

Classification

Results summary

Results by round

Matches

First League 

Source: hajduk.hr

Yugoslav Cup 

Sources: hajduk.hr

European Cup 

Source: hajduk.hr

Player seasonal records

Top scorers 

Source: Competitive matches

See also 
 1979–80 Yugoslav First League
 1979–80 Yugoslav Cup

Notes 
1. On 4 May, the match was abandoned in 41st minute, due to the death of Josip Broz Tito. Therefore, the match was voided and was replayed on 21 May.

References

External sources 
 1979–80 Yugoslav First League at rsssf.com
 1979–80 Yugoslav Cup at rsssf.com
 1979–80 European Cup at rsssf.com

HNK Hajduk Split seasons
Hajduk Split